The Peace Border (Portuguese: Fronteira da Paz; Spanish: Frontera de la Paz) it is a portion of the Brazilian-Uruguayan land border, that comprehends the twin cities of Rivera (Uruguay) and Santana do Livramento (Brazil). This name is due to the integration from the peaceful cultural interaction of the both nationalities. The border is over land, being both united (and not separated) by a common square, with an imaginary line that runs throughout streets, avenues and some marked spots.

Praça Internacional
A symbol of this fraternal coexistence is the Praça/Plaza Internacional (International Square), the only binational square in the world, sovereignly shared between the two nations in equal parts, inaugurated in February 26th, 1943, being the heads of state of both Brazil and Uruguay respectively Getúlio Vargas  and   Alfredo Baldomir, in times where the world was going through the belligerent times of the World War II (1939–1945).

References

Borders of Brazil
Borders of Uruguay